The 2017 Cotton Bowl Classic may refer to:
 2017 Cotton Bowl Classic (January), American football game played as part of the 2016–17 college football bowl season between the Western Michigan Broncos and the Wisconsin Badgers
 2017 Cotton Bowl Classic (December), American football game played as part of the 2017–18 college football bowl season between the USC Trojans and the Ohio State Buckeyes